PFC Dmitrov is a Russian football club from Dmitrov, founded in 1997. Its first season on the professional level was 2008 in the Russian Second Division, where it played in 2009. In 2010, it voluntarily dropped out of the Russian Second Division.

References

External links

Association football clubs established in 1997
Football clubs in Russia
Football in Moscow Oblast
1997 establishments in Russia